Sabiha is an Arabic word meaning "Morning" and a female given name. People with the name include:

People

Given name
Sabiha Sultan (1894–1971), Ottoman princess, daughter of Mehmed VI
Sabiha Bengütaş (1904–1992), Turkish sculptor
Sabiha Gökçen (1913–2001), Turkish female combat pilot
Sabiha Gökçül Erbay (1900–1998), Turkish teacher and politician
Sabiha Khanum (1935–2020), Pakistani film actress
Sabiha Al Khemir (born 1959), Tunisian writer, illustrator, and Islamic art expert
Sabiha Sertel (1895–1968), Turkish journalist
Sabiha Sumar (born 1961), Pakistani filmmaker

Middle name
 Hatice Sabiha Görkey (1888–1963), Turkish school teacher and politician

Other uses
Sabiha Gökçen International Airport (IATA: SAW, ICAO: LTFJ), one of the airports serving Istanbul, Turkey

Arabic feminine given names
Turkish feminine given names
Pakistani feminine given names